The 2013 Lamar Hunt U.S. Open Cup Final was the 100th edition of the Lamar Hunt U.S. Open Cup, the oldest ongoing competition in American soccer. The match featured Major League Soccer (MLS) teams D.C. United and Real Salt Lake. It was played on October 1, 2013, at Rio Tinto Stadium in Sandy, Utah, a southern suburb of Salt Lake City. It was the first Open Cup final to be held in the state of Utah. The final score was D.C. United 1, Real Salt Lake 0. This was D.C. United's third title.

It was the first final since 2008 not to feature the Seattle Sounders. It was Salt Lake's first trip to the Open Cup final, and marked their first time in a final of any competition since the 2011 CONCACAF Champions League Finals. It was D.C. United's fifth, and their first time in the final of a major North American sporting competition since 2009, when they lost the 2009 Open Cup final to Seattle.

D.C. United, the winner of the match, earned a $250,000 cash prize, as well as a berth into the 2014–15 CONCACAF Champions League. Real Salt Lake, the runner-up, received a $60,000 cash prize. D.C. United had a 5-0 record in the tournament, despite posting a 3-24-7 record in MLS play.

Road to the final

The U.S. Open Cup is an annual American soccer competition open to all United States Soccer Federation affiliated teams, from amateur adult club teams to the professional clubs of MLS. The 2013 tournament was the centennial edition of the oldest soccer tournament in the United States.

For the second consecutive season, all American-based MLS teams earned automatic qualification into the third round tournament proper. Previously, only eight teams from MLS could qualify for the tournament, six automatically based on the previous year's league results, and two more via a play-in tournament.

D.C. United

Prior to 2013, D.C. United had won the U.S. Open Cup 2 times, in 1996 and 2008. They had played in 4 finals of the competition, with the last appearance being in 2009 when they lost 2–1 to Seattle Sounders FC.

In the 2013 third round, they faced the Richmond Kickers of the USL PRO at City Stadium in Richmond, Virginia, on May 28, 2013. After a goalless draw after extra time, D.C. United won on penalties 4–2. In the fourth round, they played at home against the Philadelphia Union of MLS in Boyds, Maryland, on June 12, 2013. D.C. United won 3–1. Dwayne De Rosario scored 3 goals for United. The first came in the 24th minute of the first half, followed by goals in the 75th and 85th minutes. The only goal scored by Philadelphia was by Jack McInerney in the 76th minute.

In the quarterfinals, D.C. United played at home on June 26, 2013, against the New England Revolution. D.C. won 3–1 with goals from Chris Pontius, Dwayne De Rosario, and Lionard Pajoy in the 45th, 69th, and 87th minutes, respectively.

In the semifinals, D.C. United played on the road against the Chicago Fire on August 7, 2013, at Toyota Park in Bridgeview, Illinois. The final score was 2–0 with goals from Dwayne De Rosario and Nick DeLeon, thus sealing United's place in the cup final.

Real Salt Lake

Real Salt Lake's best finish prior to the 2013 tournament was in 2011, when they reached the quarterfinals, losing 2–0 away to FC Dallas. On May 28, 2013, Real played in the third round at home versus the Atlanta Silverbacks of the NASL at Rio Tinto Stadium. The end result was a 3–2 win in overtime. In the fourth round, they played against the Charleston Battery of the USL PRO league on June 12, 2013. Real Salt Lake won 5–2 after extra time.

In the quarterfinals, Real played against the Carolina RailHawks of the NASL on June 26, 2013. Salt Lake won 3–0 with goals from Tony Beltran in the 35th minute, Chris Wingert in the 51st minute, and Álvaro Saborío in the 86th minute.

In the semifinals, Real played against the Portland Timbers of the MLS on August 7, 2013. The end result was a 2–1 victory for Real with goals from Álvaro Saborío in the 7th minute and Joao Plata in the 78th minute. In the final minutes, Portland scored with a goal by Diego Valeri.

Pre-match

Venue Selection

The United States Soccer Federation conducted a coin flip on July 30, 2013, to determine the host of the tournament. The winner of the coin flip was the Portland Timbers/Real Salt Lake semifinal, meaning that whoever won that semifinal would host the final. As Salt Lake beat Portland 2–1 in that game, the final took place at Rio Tinto Stadium in Sandy, Utah.

Match
The match was televised live on GolTV.

Match details

Man of the Match:
Bill Hamid (D.C. United)

Statistics 
Overall

References

External links
Video Highlights

2013 U.S. Open Cup
U.S. Open Cup Final 2013
U.S. Open Cup Final 2013
Soccer in Utah
U.S. Open Cup Finals
2013 in sports in Utah